North American Area code 307 is the area code that serves the entire U.S. state of Wyoming.  It is one of the original area codes created in 1947.

Because it is sparsely populated, Wyoming is one of only 11 states (as of April 8, 2020) to only have one area code.

Communities included
Communities, with their respective exchanges:

 Afton: 226, 248, 884, 885, 886, 887
 Albin: 246
 Alpine: 654, 656
 Baggs: 380, 383
 Basin: 440, 568
 Big Piney: 260, 276
 Buffalo: 217, 278, 425, 620, 621, 684, 719
 Burlington: 762
 Burns: 547
 Casper: 215, 224, 230, 232, 233, 234, 235, 236, 237, 243, 247, 251, 253, 258, 259, 261, 262, 265, 266, 267, 268, 277, 315, 333, 337, 377, 439, 441, 462, 472, 473, 577, 702, 724, 776, 797, 995
 Cheyenne: 214, 220, 221, 222, 256, 274, 275, 286, 287, 316, 317, 365, 369, 414, 421, 426, 432, 433, 443, 459, 475, 477, 509, 514, 529, 630, 631, 632, 633, 634, 635, 637, 638, 640, 650, 666, 701, 757, 771, 772, 773, 775, 777, 778, 823, 829, 920, 996
 Chugwater: 422
 Clearmont: 758
 Cody: 204, 213, 250, 272, 296, 527, 578, 586, 587, 712, 899
 Cokeville: 229, 270, 279, 600
 Douglas: 298, 351, 358, 359, 624, 717
 Dubois: 239, 450, 455
 East Thermopolis: 480, 722, 864, 921
 Encampment: 327
 Evanston: 255, 288, 313, 444, 497, 677, 679, 708, 783, 789, 799
 Frannie: 664
 Gas Hills: 457
 Gillette: 228, 257, 299, 363, 487, 567, 622, 660, 670, 680, 681, 682, 685, 686, 687, 688, 689, 696, 704 
 Glendo: 735
 Glenrock: 309, 436, 554, 741
 Green River: 297, 364, 466, 707, 870, 871, 872, 875
 Greybull: 373, 765
 Guernsey: 836
 Hanna: 325, 339, 348
 Hulett: 467
 Jackson: 200, 201, 203, 249, 264, 413, 690, 699, 713, 730, 732, 733, 734, 739, 740, 774
 Kaycee: 738
 Kemmerer: 723, 727, 800, 828, 877
 La Barge: 386, 390
 La Grange: 409, 834
 Lander: 206, 330, 332, 335, 345, 349, 438, 488, 714
 Laramie: 223, 314, 343, 399, 460, 703, 721, 742, 745, 755, 760, 761, 766, 977
 Lingle: 205, 837
 Lovell: 548, 731
 Lusk: 216, 334, 340, 481, 759
 Lyman: 787
 Manila: 874
 Medicine Bow: 379, 404, 520
 Meeteetse,: 868
 Midwest: 437
 Moran: 541, 543, 999
 Moorcroft: 391, 756
 Mountain View: 747, 780, 782
 Newcastle: 465, 629, 744, 746, 941, 949
 Pine Bluffs: 245
 Pinedale: 231, 360, 367, 537, 749
 Powell: 202, 219, 254, 271, 716, 754, 764
 Rawlins: 320, 321, 324, 328, 370, 417, 710
 Riverton: 240, 463, 709, 840, 850, 851, 854, 855, 856, 857, 858
 Rock River: 378, 798
 Rock Springs: 209, 212, 252, 350, 352, 354, 362, 371, 382, 389, 448, 522, 705, 922
 Saratoga: 326, 329, 447
 Sheridan: 429, 461, 533, 655, 672, 673, 674, 675, 683, 706, 751, 752, 763
 Shoshoni: 728, 876
 Sundance: 281, 282, 283, 290, 790
 Ten Sleep: 366
 Thermopolis: 480, 722, 864, 921
 Torrington: 338, 401, 532, 534, 575, 715
 Upton: 468
 West Edgemont: 663
 West Lyman: 788
 Wheatland: 241, 269, 322, 331, 720, 779, 881
 Worland: 347, 375, 388, 431, 718
 Wright: 464, 939
 Premium calls (unassigned): 208, 211, 307, 308, 311, 406, 411, 470, 511, 536, 555, 558, 559, 605, 611, 700, 711, 725, 811, 911, 950, 958, 959, 970, 976.

External links

307
307
Telecommunications-related introductions in 1947